Tritonoharpa is a genus of sea snails, marine gastropod mollusks in the family Cancellariidae, the nutmeg snails.

Species
Species within the genus Tritonoharpa include:
 † Tritonoharpa alanbeui Landau, Harzhauser, İslamoğlu & da Silva, 2013 
 Tritonoharpa angasi (Brazier, 1877)
 Tritonoharpa ansonae Beu & Maxwell, 1987
 Tritonoharpa antiquata (Hinds in Reeve, 1844)
 † Tritonoharpa aquitaniensis Lesport, Cluzaud & Verhecken, 2015 
 Tritonoharpa aphrogenia (Pilsbry & Lowe, 1932)
 Tritonoharpa basilaevis Beu & Maxwell, 1987
 Tritonoharpa bayeri (Petuch, 1987)
 Tritonoharpa beui Verhecken, 1997
 Tritonoharpa boucheti Beu & Maxwell, 1987
 Tritonoharpa brunnea Beu & Maxwell, 1987
 † Tritonoharpa caunbonensis Pacaud, Ledon & Loubry, 2015 
 Tritonoharpa coxi (Brazier, 1872)
 Tritonoharpa cubapatriae (Sarasúa, 1975)
 Tritonoharpa cubapatrie (Sarasúa, 1975)
 Tritonoharpa curvapex Souza, Gomes & P. M. Costa, 2020
 †Tritonoharpa floridensis (H. I. Tucker & D. Wilson, 1932)
 Tritonoharpa indoceana Beu & Maxwell, 1987
 Tritonoharpa janowskyi Petuch & Sargent, 2011
 Tritonoharpa lanceolata (Menke, 1828)
 Tritonoharpa leali Harasewych, Petit & Verhecken, 1992
 † Tritonoharpa mariechristinae Lesport, Cluzaud & Verhecken, 2015 
 † Tritonoharpa nodulata (Tate, 1888) 
 Tritonoharpa panamensis (M. Smith, 1947)
 Tritonoharpa ponderi Beu & Maxwell, 1987
 † Tritonoharpa praetexta (Bellardi, 1872) 
 Tritonoharpa pseudangasi Beu & Maxwell, 1987
 † Tritonoharpa renardi Lesport, Cluzaud & Verhecken, 2015 
 Tritonoharpa siphonata (Reeve, 1844)
 †Tritonoharpa speciosa (Bellardi, 1872) 
 Tritonoharpa vexillata Dall, 1908
 Tritonoharpa westralia Beu & Maxwell, 1987

References

 Hemmen, J. (2007). Recent Cancellariidae. Annotated and illustrated catalogue of Recent Cancellariidae. Privately published, Wiesbaden. 428 pp.
 Beu, A. G.; Maxwell, P. A. (1987). A revision of the fossil and living gastropods related to Plesiotriton Fischer, 1884 (Family Cancellariidae, Subfamily Plesiotritoninae n. subfam.). With an appendix: Genera of Buccinidae Pisaniinae related to Colubraria Schumacher, 1817. New Zealand Geological Survey Paleontological Bulletin. 54: 1-140.

External links
 Dall, W. H. (1908). Reports on the dredging operations off the west coast of Central America to the Galapagos, to the west coast of Mexico, and in the Gulf of California, in charge of Alexander Agassiz, carried on by the U.S. Fish Commission steamer "Albatross," during 1891, Lieut.-Commander Z.L. Tanner, U.S.N., commanding. XXXVII. Reports on the scientific results of the expedition to the eastern tropical Pacific, in charge of Alexander Agassiz, by the U.S. Fish Commission steamer "Albatross", from October, 1904 to March, 1905, Lieut.-Commander L.M. Garrett, U.S.N., commanding. XIV. The Mollusca and Brachiopoda. Bulletin of the Museum of Comparative Zoology. 43(6): 205-487, pls 1-22

Cancellariidae
Marine molluscs
Gastropods